AUTEN-67 is an autophagy-enhancing drug candidate that increases autophagic flux in cell lines and in vivo models.

It hampers the progression of neurodegenerative symptoms in a Drosophila model of Huntington's disease.
It is developed by Velgene Biotechnology Ltd.

References 

Neuroprotective agents
Sulfonamides
Experimental drugs